Leke is a town in Belgium.

Leke also may refer to:

People

Given name 
 Leke Alder, Nigerian lawyer
 Lekë Dukagjini (1410–1481), Albanian nobleman
 Leke James (born 1992), Norwegian footballer
 Leke Odunsi (born 1980), English footballer
 Lekë Zaharia (died 1444), Albanian nobleman

Surname 
 Leke baronets, two baronet titles created for the English Leke family
 Francis Leke (disambiguation)
 Henry Leke, English Member of Parliament in 1547 and 1554
 Nicholas Leke, 4th Earl of Scarsdale (1682–1736)
 Robert Leke, 3rd Earl of Scarsdale (1654–1707)

Other uses 
 Leke, a town in Belgium
 Albanian lek
 Leke script